The 1998 State of Origin series saw the 17th time that the annual three-game series between the Queensland and New South Wales representative rugby league football teams was contested entirely under 'state of origin' selection rules. The return of Super League-aligned stars to Origin following the end of the game's crippling civil war meant the stampeding Brisbane Broncos players were back - to the chagrin of the Blues. The series was notable for being the first in which no team won a game at home.



Game I

Game I was a classic Origin encounter with each side scrambling to gain ascendancy in front of a boisterous Sydney crowd. The Maroons capitalised on mistakes from their opposition to score twice early in the second half before the mercurial Brad Fittler crossed to regain the lead for New South Wales. When Steve Menzies scored close to full-time to give the Blues a 23-18 lead it seemed that they were heading for victory.

But with barely a minute remaining and Queensland stuck deep in their own territory, their five-eighth Kevin Walters produced the play of the series as he kicked ahead for replacement back Ben Ikin to regather. The Blues tried desperately to hold on for the few final tackles, but Walters destroyed their hopes by sending centre Tonie Carroll over alongside the posts. Darren Lockyer's conversion on debut after the siren gave Queensland a miracle 24-23 victory. It was a personal triumph for Walters coming only a few months after the death of his wife Kim.

Game II

In Game II, after falling behind early to a Wendell Sailor try, the Blues took control in the volatile surroundings of Suncorp Stadium. New South Wales centre Paul McGregor, replacing Andrew Ettingshausen in the starting line-up, scored twice and Brad Fittler added a third to give the visitors a commanding 20-6 lead from which the Maroons never recovered.

Andrew Johns was superb during the Blues' onslaught while Laurie Daley set up the try that levelled the score following Sailor's third-minute opener. A Tim Brasher try shortly after the break ended any hopes of another come-from-behind Queensland win and the final 26-10 scoreline was a fair reflection of the Blues domination over their opposition.

Game III
Before the Game III return to the Sydney Football Stadium for the decider there was little warning of the problems the New South Wales team were about to encounter when they were flattened by injury and illness. Six players from the selected squad including props Paul Harragon and Rodney Howe and inspirational hooker Geoff Toovey were forced to withdraw prior to the game.

Queensland emerged full of running, tries to Walters, dummying his way over and then Ikin, giving them a 12-4 lead before Allan Langer wrapped up the series with a late try. A Jason Smith field goal rounded out the impressive Queensland 19-4 win.

New South Wales squad

Queensland squad

See also
 1998 NRL season

References

Sources
 Big League's 25 Years of Origin Collectors' Edition, News Magazines, Surry Hills, Sydney

State of Origin series
State of Origin series